is a Tendai Buddhist temple in the city of Nikkō, Tochigi Prefecture, Japan.

History 
The site was established in 766 by the Buddhist monk Shōdō Shōnin (735–817). Due to its geographic isolation, deep in the mountains of Japan, the site soon attracted other Buddhist monks in search of solitude, and it still is considered an important base for ascetic training among Tendai monks.

Together with Nikkō Tōshō-gū and Futarasan Shrine, it forms the Shrines and Temples of Nikkō UNESCO World Heritage Site, with 42 structures of the shrine included in the nomination.

Architecture 
This building features gold-leafed statues of Amida, Senju Kannon ("Kannon with a thousand arms") and Batō Kannon ("Kannon with a horse's head"). These deities are considered as Buddhist manifestations of Nikkō's three mountain kami enshrined at Futarasan Shrine.

Next to the Sanbutsudō Hall there are Shōyō-en Garden and the Rinno-ji Homotsu-den Hall ("Treasure House of Rinnō-ji"). The latter houses an important collection of Buddhist art, including sculptures, paintings, calligraphy, scrolls and other crafts, mainly from the 8th century, and approximately 50 of them are on display at any given time. It is designated a National Treasure.

Technically a shinto shrine, it was built in 1653 in the Gongen-zukuri style and it is designated a National Treasure of Japan in that category. It has been described by the World Heritage Committee as "a pure masterpiece of architecture and decoration". 37 other structures in the temple complex are designated as Important Cultural Properties.

See also 
 For an explanation of terms concerning Japanese Buddhism, Japanese Buddhist art, and Japanese Buddhist temple architecture, see the Glossary of Japanese Buddhism.

References

External links 

 Official website (in Japanese)
 UNESCO website - Shrines and Temples of Nikko
 Rinnoji Travel Guide

8th-century establishments in Japan
Buddhist temples in Tochigi Prefecture
World Heritage Sites in Japan
National Treasures of Japan
Important Cultural Properties of Japan
Tendai temples
Monzeki
Religious buildings and structures completed in 766